Coiffaitarctia groisonae is a moth of the family Erebidae first described by Hervé de Toulgoët in 1991. It is found in French Guiana.

References

Phaegopterina
Moths of South America
Moths described in 1991